The Basketball Tournament 2018 was the fifth edition of The Basketball Tournament, a 5-on-5, single elimination basketball tournament broadcast by the ESPN family of networks. The tournament involved 72 teams; it started on June 29 and continued through August 3, 2018. The winner of the final, Overseas Elite, received a two million dollar prize.

Format 
The tournament started with a field of 72 teams, organized into four regions of 18 teams, all of which were seeded. The 18 teams in each region consisted of: nine teams selected based on fan popularity per the tournament's website, four teams selected via at-large bids, four teams accepted via buy-in of a $5000 fee, and the returning regional winner from the 2017 tournament.

Dunk contest

The Puma Hoops Dunk Contest was held during the Super 16 round, on July 27, with six contestants. There were four celebrity judges: Dominique Wilkins, Terry Rozier, God Shammgod, and Instagram personality @dunk. The contest winner was Marcus Lewis of Illinois BC, with Derek Cooke of Team Fredette as the runner-up; they were awarded prizes of $40,000 and $10,000, respectively.

Venues
The Basketball Tournament 2018 took place in eight locations. Orange dots mark the locations of the two regional pods, red dots mark regional locations, the blue dot marks the Super 16 and quarterfinal location, and the green dot marks the semifinal and finals location.

Alumni Teams
Multiple teams in the tournament were comprised mostly or exclusively of alumni of a particular school. These teams are listed below.

Additionally, team We Are D3, the 13th seed in the West region, consisted of alumni from NCAA Division III programs.

Schedule
Games televised on ESPN, ESPN2, or ESPNU, with game replays available on ESPN3.

Bracket
All times Eastern. Source:

Northeast Region – Brooklyn, NY

Northeast Regional Final

Midwest Regional – Columbus, OH

Midwest Regional Final

South Regional – Richmond, VA

South Regional Final

West Regional – Los Angeles, CA

West Regional Final

Semifinals – Baltimore, MD

Semifinals

Championship

Awards

Source:

References

Further reading

External links
 2018 TBT Semifinal - #7 Eberlein Drive VS #2 Team Fredette
 2018 TBT Semifinal - #3 Golden Eagles VS #1 Overseas Elite
 2018 TBT Championship - #7 Eberlein Drive VS #1 Overseas Elite

The Basketball Tournament
2018–19 in American basketball
July 2018 sports events in the United States
August 2018 sports events in the United States
Basketball competitions in Atlanta
Basketball competitions in Baltimore